Jacques Denjean (25 May 1929 – 21 December 1995) was a French composer and arranger, active in the 1960s and 1970s.

He worked with artists such as Dionne Warwick, Françoise Hardy, Nana Mouskouri, Johnny Hallyday, Barış Manço, Maria del Mar Bonet and Guy Béart, chiefly as an arranger.

Denjean was also a member of the French vocal group, Les Double Six.

He is also known for his film scores, including:
 Morbo (1972)
 Vive la vie (TV) (1966)
 Adieu Philippine (1962)

Discography
LPs
 Jazz (1962)
 Un disque à tout casser (1963)
 The Tough Touch (1964)

EPs
 La route (1963)
 Écoutez-moi (1965)

Singles
 "Névrose / Psychomaniac"

References

External links
 Denjean performing as a member of Les Double Six

1929 births
1995 deaths
French film score composers
French male film score composers
Eurovision Song Contest conductors
20th-century French composers
Place of birth missing
20th-century conductors (music)
20th-century French male musicians
Les Double Six members